June Buchanan (June 21, 1887 – May 31, 1988) was an American educator and the co-founder of Alice Lloyd College in Pippa Passes, Kentucky.

Early life
According to P. David Searles' book, A College for Appalachia, Buchanan was born in upstate New York in 1886 and grew up in Moravia. The obituary published by the Associated Press in June 1988, however, stated that she died at the age of 100, and the Social Security Death Index records her date of birth as June 21, 1887. This birthdate is confirmed by her great-niece, Eleanor Gibney of St. John, Virgin Islands. June Buchanan's parents, Frank Buchanan and Julia McCormick Buchanan, hailed from small towns near Syracuse.

Education
Buchanan graduated from Syracuse University in 1913 with a degree in science. After teaching in Groton, New York, she pursued graduate studies at Wellesley College, with a focus on liberal arts. While at Wellesley, she encountered fellow students who heard of Alice Spencer Geddes Lloyd's efforts to educate children in the Appalachian Mountains of Knott County, Kentucky.

Career
In January 1919, she arrived in Pippa Passes to assist Lloyd's efforts at the Caney Creek Community Center. In 1923, she and Lloyd chartered Caney Junior College, which would be renamed Alice Lloyd College upon Lloyd's death in 1962. In 1976, a campus building, the June Buchanan Alumni Center, was named in her honor. Buchanan later became mayor of Pippa Passes. The college's K-12 prep school, the June Buchanan School, was named in her honor in 1984.

Death and legacy
Buchanan continued to serve the college until her death in May 1988. She died at a hospital in the city of Martin in neighboring Floyd County. In addition to the June Buchanan School and the June Buchanan Alumni Center named in her honor, the June Buchanan Medical Clinic, a community health clinic owned and operated by the University of Kentucky's Centers for Excellence in Rural Health, is located in Hindman, the county seat of Knott County.

References

External links
Alice Lloyd College
June Buchanan School

Syracuse University alumni
People from Moravia, New York
People from Knott County, Kentucky
American centenarians
University and college founders
Founders of schools in the United States
1887 births
1988 deaths
Alice Lloyd College people
People from Groton, New York
Educators from New York (state)
American women educators
Women centenarians
20th-century philanthropists
People from Floyd County, Kentucky